The rainforest frog is a genus of microhylid frogs.

Rainforest frog may also refer to:

 Rainforest reed frog, a frog found in Cameroon, Central African Republic, Republic of the Congo, Democratic Republic of the Congo, Equatorial Guinea, Gabon, and Nigeria
 Rainforest rocket frog, a frog found in Costa Rica and Panama

See also

 Forest rain frog

Animal common name disambiguation pages